2002 was a year.

2002 may also refer to:
Albums
2002 (Tha Dogg Pound album)
2002 (Gary album)
2002 (Brazzaville album)
Cusco 2002, an album by the German New Age band Cusco
MMII (album), a DJ mix by John Digweed

Other usage
2002 (band)
"2002" (song), a 2018 song by English singer Anne-Marie
2002 (film), a Hong Kong science fiction film
BMW 2002, a range of cars produced by the automaker
Prefix used for the 6to4 IPv6 transition mechanism